Cleanskin may refer to:

Cleanskin (animal) or maverick, an unbranded range animal
Cleanskin (film), a 2012 British terrorist thriller starring Sean Bean and Charlotte Rampling
Cleanskin (security), an undercover operative unknown to his or her targets, or a terrorist unknown to national security services
Cleanskin (wine), unbranded wine
Cleanskin, an album by Brian Cadd
"Clean Skin", an episode of the television drama Homeland